Eidnes is a surname. Notable people with the surname include:

Arnljot Karstein Eidnes (1909–1990), Norwegian politician
Hans Eidnes (1887–1962), Norwegian politician